Urkevitz is an uninhabited German island in the West Pomeranian Lagoon Area National Park. It lies in the Baltic Sea between the islands of Rügen and Ummanz, and is less than 100 metres from the latter. The island is about 1,000 metres long, up to 300 metres wide and up to 5 metres above sea level.

Like its neighbours, Liebes, Mährens and Wührens, it is a bird reserve. A bridge runs from Ummanz to Urkevitz, but the island is out-of-bounds to the public

Islands of Mecklenburg-Western Pomerania
German islands in the Baltic
Bird reserves in Germany
Ummanz
Uninhabited islands of Germany